Chris Ryan McCallan Douglas (born 20 November 1989) is a cricketer who has played two One Day Internationals for Bermuda. In October 2021, he was named in Bermuda's Twenty20 International (T20I) squad for the 2021 ICC Men's T20 World Cup Americas Qualifier tournament in Antigua.

References

External links 
CricketArchive
Cricinfo

1989 births
Living people
Bermuda One Day International cricketers
Bermudian cricketers